List of fellows and residents of the American Academy in Rome is a list of those who have been awarded the Rome Prize or were residents of the American Academy in Rome.

The Rome Prize is a prestigious American award made annually by the American Academy in Rome, through a national competition, to 15 emerging artists (working in architecture, landscape architecture, design, historic preservation and conservation, literature, musical composition, or visual arts) and to 15 scholars (working in ancient, medieval, renaissance and early modern, or modern Italian studies). Residents are selected from scholars and creative artists at a further stages in their career for shorter residencies at the American Academy.  Some of these residents are marked (R) in the table below.

Fellows and residents of the American Academy in Rome

References

Notes

Sources 
 Society of Fellows, American Academy in Rome, Member Directory
 List of Rome Prize Fellows

External links
 American Academy in Rome, official website of the academy
 American Academy in Rome

American awards
Arts awards
Architecture awards
American music awards
History awards
Education in Rome
Culture in Rome
Fellows of the American Academy in Rome 2011-present
2010s awards
2011